Gisela Schlüter (6 June 1914 – 28 October 1995) was a German cabaret performer and actress.

Early life 
Gisela Schlüter was born in Berlin and grew up in Dresden. Her father was an army officer and mother came from Czechoslovakia. She felt drawn to the stage at an early age. At first, she wanted to become a dancer and completed a corresponding training. At 1.76 m, however, she was too tall for such a stage career. Therefore, she took lessons from the Dresden actor Erich Ponto.

Career 
She began her acting career at the age of 19. In her first year of work, she was already involved in four film productions. After further films, she found her field of activity mainly in cabaret, so that she only had a few film appearances in the years that followed. After training and the first professional steps, she had her first stage appearance in Berlin with Günther Lüders as a partner in the tabloid play Caution Brigitte, in which she showed her talent as a quick speaker. A year later, she played alongside Liesl Karlstadt and Karl Valentin in the well-known Berlin cabaret of comedians. As a stage actress, Gisela Schlüter impressed with her versatility by dancing, singing, parodying and acting.

Together with Brigitte Mira, she played in a Nazi propaganda series entitled Liese and Miese. “Liese” did everything right in the sense of Nazi propaganda in contrast to "Miese". Brigitte Mira as "Miese", however, had more sympathy with the audience than the "Liese" played by Gisela Schlüter, so that the Propaganda Ministry soon canceled the series as counterproductive.

She also worked as a film actress, among others in We Dance Around the World (1939), The Tiger of Eschnapur (1937/38), A Night in May (1938), The Indian Tomb (1937/38), Six Days Home Leave (1941) and Our Auntie Is The Last (1973). In the post-war period, along with many theater tours, she was the star of the Hamburg cabaret revue Faust, part three.

Gisela Schlüter had her first small television appearance in Vico Torriani's show Grüezi Vico. After numerous guest appearances in well-known television shows, she received her own television show on 25 January 1963 at the NDR in Hamburg, entitled Zwischenmahlzeit, in which she appeared as a comedian and entertainer. During this time, she became a show master who, through her dominant verbal rhetoric, barely let her stage partners have their say. Her speaking speed (up to 482 syllables per minute) and her seemingly never-ending torrent of speech became her trademarks. This resulted in her nicknames "Lady Schnatterly" and "Chatterbox of the Nation".

By the year 1982, Zwischenmahlzeit was broadcast four times a year, reaching ratings of up to 44%. In 1976, Gisela Schlüter received the Golden Camera from the television magazine HÖRZU for her show.

Personal life 
Gisela Schlüter's hobby was astrology. She created horoscopes and dealt extensively with the constellations.

Her long-term partner, the television writer Hans Hubberten, was closely connected to Schlüter's professional career. He wrote all 35 episodes of Zwischenmahlzeit for her. Their professional proximity brought them together, and they spent 28 years together until Hubberten's death in 1988. Both lived in a house in Bad Kohlgrub, Bavaria, for many years. After Hubberten's death, Schlüter largely withdrew from the public eye.

In 1993, Gisela Schlüter broke her spine, later several ribs and a thigh. She never fully recovered from her injuries. On 28 October 1995 she died of a stroke at the age of 81 and was buried in Bad Kohlgrub.

Filmography 

 1937/38: Der Tiger von Eschnapur
 1937/38: Das indische Grabmal
 1937: Das Ehesanatorium
 1938: Narren im Schnee
 1938: Eine Nacht im Mai
 1941: Der Gasmann
 1950: Dreizehn unter einem Hut
 1957: Mikosch, der Stolz der Kompanie
 1957: Die große Chance
 1959: Peter schiesst den Vogel ab
 1972: Die lustigen Vier von der Tankstelle
 1973: Unsere Tante ist das Letzte
 1973: Das Wandern ist Herrn Müllers Lust

References

External links 
 

1914 births
1995 deaths
German stage actresses
German film actresses
German cabaret performers